Starfire Optical Range (SOR - Pronounced as an initialism) is a United States Air Force research laboratory on the Kirtland Air Force Base in Albuquerque, New Mexico. Its primary duty, according to the official website, is to "develop and demonstrate optical wavefront control technologies." The range is a secure lab facility and is a division of the Directed Energy Directorate of the Air Force Research Laboratory.

SOR's optical equipment includes a 3.5 meter telescope which is "one of the largest telescopes in the world equipped with adaptive optics designed for satellite tracking" according to the Air Force, a 1.5 meter telescope, and a 1-meter beam director.

Purpose
The purpose of Starfire is to conduct research to use adaptive optics to remove the effects of scintillation (atmospheric turbulence).  Turbulence interferes with laser beam integrity over distances.  Lasers are being used for long-distance high-bandwidth communications and accuracy in air-to-air laser connectivity is important for data integrity.

Scintillation is also a problem in development of weaponized lasers, such as the airborne laser being developed to intercept intercontinental ballistic missiles.

According to an article published on May 3, 2006, in The New York Times, research is being conducted at the laboratory into how to use ground-based lasers to disable satellites; that is, as an anti-satellite weapon.

See also

 North Oscura Peak
List of the largest optical telescopes in the contiguous United States

References

External links
Official SOR website
Starfire Optical Observatory page at globalsecurity.org

Buildings and structures in Bernalillo County, New Mexico
Space weapons
Research installations of the United States Air Force
Observatories
Air Force Research Laboratory projects